Painted Thin was a Canadian hardcore punk band, formed in Winnipeg, and active from 1993 to 1999. The core of the band consisted of vocalist and guitarist Stephen Carroll and bassist and vocalist Paul Furgale, with a variety of guest musicians, including James Ash, Dan McCafferty and Jason Tait, on individual recordings.

History
Painted Thin got together in 1993. That year they released a six-song demo tape entitled Losing Games which featured the songs: "20", "Andrew", "Disposable Song", "Clearly Contrived", "Revelations", and "Breakdown". This was followed by Small Acts of Love and Rebellion, a split CD with John K. Samson, in 1995 on G7 Welcoming Committee Records, and the albums Still They Die of Heartbreak in 1997 and Clear, Plausible Stories in 1999 before breaking up.

Carroll and Tait went on to join Samson's band, The Weakerthans, while Furgale started the band Sixty Stories. In 2001, some unreleased Painted Thin material appeared on a split album with Sixty Stories, Different Places to Sit / A Loveless Kiss.

Small Acts was rereleased on G7 Welcoming Committee in 2006.

Discography
 Losing Games (1993) 6-song self-released Demo Tape
 Small Acts of Love and Rebellion (1995), split with John K. Samson, Little Pictures
 Still They Die of Heartbreak EP (1997) 18:01 Endearing Records NDR 08
Track listing:
 "John Wayne's Wettest Dream" – 1:08
 "Piece by Piece" – 2:53
 "For Sarah and Me" – 3:22
 "I Left a Love Note on the Wall in Saskatoon" – 1:55
 Story You Have Heard Before" (John K. Samson) – 3:15
 "Stepping on Toes" – 2:29
 "Mexico" – 3:01

 Clear, Plausible Stories (1999)
 A Loveless Kiss (2001) — split with Sixty Stories, Different Places to Sit
 Small Acts of Love and Rebellion (rerelease, 2006)

References

External links
 Painted Thin at G7 Welcoming Committee Records

Musical groups established in 1994
Musical groups disestablished in 1999
Musical groups from Winnipeg
Canadian hardcore punk groups
G7 Welcoming Committee Records artists
1994 establishments in Manitoba
1999 disestablishments in Canada